Macon Road Baptist School is a private Baptist Christian school with several locations in the Memphis, Tennessee area.

Overview 
Macon Road's main campus, which has grades K–12, is located in Arlington. Macon Road's other two campuses, which host pre-kindergarten and kindergarten students, are in Lakeland and Oakland (Fayette County). Macon Road has around 500 K3–12 students, around 200 of which are in the 7–12th grades. The school mascot is the Kingsmen and the colors are blue, black, and white.

History 
Macon Road Baptist Church opened the school in 1973 in the churches buildings, which was located at what is now the school's Berclair Road campus. The school was part of a wave of private schools formed by white parents seeking to avoid sending their children to racially integrated public schools.

Wayne Webb has headed the school since 1974.In March 2014, Macon Road became accredited through the Southern Association of Colleges and Schools Council on Accreditation and School Improvement (SACS CASI), an accreditation division of AdvancED.

Academics 
Macon Road uses the Abeka Curriculum, produced by Pensacola Christian College, in most of its preschool and elementary classes.   All students are required to take a Bible class from K3–12th grade; a King James Version Bible is required. AP English (11th and 12th grades) and AP Biology (12th grade) are the only Advanced Placement courses offered. Online dual enrollment for college credit is also offered. Other electives include Yearbook, Personal Fitness, Christian Ethics, and various higher level sciences and math classes including Anatomy and Physiology, Physics, and Advanced Math.  The school-wide average ACT composite score in 2012 was a 23.

References

1973 establishments in Tennessee
Baptist schools in the United States
Christian schools in Tennessee
Education in Fayette County, Tennessee
Educational institutions established in 1973
Private K-12 schools in Tennessee
Schools in Memphis, Tennessee
Segregation academies in Tennessee